Lakeview is an unincorporated community in Ray County, in the U.S. state of Missouri and part of the Kansas City metropolitan area.

History
A post office called Lake View was established in 1893, and remained in operation until 1904. The community was on Lake Heisinger, hence the name.

References

Unincorporated communities in Ray County, Missouri
Unincorporated communities in Missouri